Thomas Breen (born 13 September 1972) is a Norwegian politician for the Labour Party (AP). He represents Hedmark in the Norwegian Parliament, where he was elected to replace of Knut Storberget, who was appointed to a government position.

Parliamentary Committee duties 
2005 - 2009 member of the Standing Committee on Justice.

External links

1972 births
Living people
Labour Party (Norway) politicians
Members of the Storting
21st-century Norwegian politicians